Pyrgomorpha conica is a species of pyrgomorph (gaudy grasshoppers) native to Africa, Western Asia and Southern Europe.

References

Pyrgomorphidae
Insects described in 1791